Eudalia is a genus of beetles in the family Carabidae, containing the following species:

 Eudalia atrata Baehr, 2005
 Eudalia castelnaui Sloane, 1910
 Eudalia femorata Baehr, 2005
 Eudalia latipennis (Macleay, 1864)
 Eudalia liebherri Baehr, 2006
 Eudalia macleayi Bates, 1871
 Eudalia minor Baehr, 2005
 Eudalia obliquiceps Sloane, 1917
 Eudalia punctipennis Baehr, 2005
 Eudalia reticulata Baehr, 2005
 Eudalia waterhousei Castelnau, 1867

References

Lebiinae